A voiceless retroflex implosive is a rare consonantal sound, used in some spoken languages. There is no official symbol in the International Phonetic Alphabet that represents this sound, but  or  may be used, or the old convention .

Features
Features of the voiceless retroflex implosive:

Occurrence 
A rare and evidently unstable sound,  has been described in Oromo of Ethiopia, and Ngiti of the Democratic Republic of the Congo.

References

Retroflex consonants
Implosives
Voiceless oral consonants